Wang Shuangfei (born September 1963) is a Chinese engineer who is a professor at Guangxi University, and an academician of the Chinese Academy of Engineering. He is a representative of the 19th National Congress of the Communist Party of China.

Biography 
Wang was born in You County, Hunan, in September 1963. He earned his doctor's degree from South China University of Technology in 1995. He was a postdoctoral fellow at Georgia Tech from 2001 to 2003. He was a visiting scholar at the University of Melbourne in 1999 and the University of British Columbia between 2007 and 2008.

Wang taught at Guangxi University since June 1995.

Honours and awards 
 2014 National Labor Medal
 2021 Science and Technology Innovation Award of the Ho Leung Ho Lee Foundation
 18 November 2021 Member of the Chinese Academy of Engineering (CAE)

References 

1963 births
Living people
People from You County
Engineers from Hunan
South China University of Technology alumni
Academic staff of Guangxi University
Members of the Chinese Academy of Engineering